ʻUiha is an island in Lifuka district, in the Haʻapai islands of Tonga. The island has two villages, ʻUiha and Felemea.

In September 2022 the island's electricity system was transition from a diesel generator to a solar-battery system with diesel backup.

See also 
 List of islands and towns in Tonga

References 

Islands of Tonga
Haʻapai